Gatecrasher Wet is the third Andrew Gallagher produced album for Gatecrasher, released in 1999.

Release
On 26 July 1999, the Sheffield-based club Gatecrasher released their third album, titled Gatecrasher Wet. Despite the massive success of the Gallagher produced albums Gatecrasher Black (1998) and Gatecrasher Red (Feb 1999) the third installment was initially rebuked by Simon Raine and Scott Bond due to the Northern expression "don't talk wet", but Gallagher persevered with his concept, explaining that its release date would coincide with what was to be an incredible summer of dance music. The album debuted at #3 in the UK compilation charts.

Presentation
Gallagher's previous two Gatecrasher albums had a unique look and feel in their presentation (velvet covers with golden lettering for the special editions) his third instalment didn't disappoint, with a card digipack, layered with slippery plastic for the water droplet effects, and the lion logo. The tag line on the back of the album showed true confidence in the album; "Immerse yourself in the greatest dance album of the summer..." The inner contained a bold yellow booklet to continue the summer theme, and 2 teal blue discs, named Sub and Aqua respectively.

Sound
Scott Bond once again mixed the album and gave the album a 'Wet' feel and theme, with a selection of songs that gave wet, Ibiza sound. "Saltwater" by Chicane - one of the years big hits, was added to the album which tried to reflect the sounds that people associate with the summer - bright, wet, and uplifting.

Disc 1, named 'Sub' had the more variety of sounds and rhythms, whilst Disc 2, named 'Aqua' had a "harder" sound to it.

Track listing
Sub
 Phuture 2000 (Hybrid Remix) - Carl Cox
 Finished Symphony - Hybrid
 831 - Desyfer
 Game Master (Signum Remix) - Lost Tribe
 Liquid (Trilithon Mix) - Nebular B
 Liberation (Fly Like An Angel) (Ferry Corsten Remix) - Matt Darey
 Everytime (Mike Koglin Remix) - Lustral
 Synaesthesia (En Motion Mix) - The Thrillseekers
 The Hymn (Mea Culpa Mix) - Skyscraper
 Cream (Original Mix) - Blank & Jones
 The Child - Mea Culpa
 Pueblo Blanco - Salt Tank
 Saltwater (Tomski Vs. Disco Citizens Remix) - Chicane featuring Maire Brennan
 4G - DJ Albert
 Communication - Armin van Buuren
 Heaven (Lange Remix) - Agenda
 9pm (Till I Come) (Matt Darey Mix) - ATB
 Can't Wait To Find Love (Thrillseekers Remix) - Silhouette

Aqua
 Apache - Starfighter
 Remember (To The Millennium) (Lange Remix) - The Morrighan
 Her Desire - Jupiter
 The Awakening (Quake Remix) - York
 Carla's Theme - Transa
 Where Are You Now? (Moonman Remix) - The Generator
 Take You There - Hagen, Ron & Pascal M
 We Came - Vimana
 Obessesion Forever - Unicorn
 Everyday - Agnelli & Nelson
 I Believe (DJ Tandu Remix) - Lange
 Tomorrow (Full On Vocal Mix) - DuMonde
 Spiritulised (Astral Mix) - The Olmec Heads
 You Put Me In Heaven With Your Touch (Lange Remix) - Rhythm Of Life
 Free To Ride (U.B.I.'s Fat Tyre Mix) - Crazy Malamute
 Reincarnations (DJ JamX & De Leon's DuMonde Remix) - Steve Morley
 Pulsar (Picotto Tea Mix) - Mauro Picotto
 The Orange Theme (Moonman's Orange Juice Remix) - Cygnus X

References

 https://www.discogs.com/Various-Gatecrasher-Wet/master/49763

1999 albums
Trance albums
DJ mix albums